Orth Stein "Buck" Collins (April 27, 1880 – December 13, 1949) was a  Major League Baseball outfielder and pitcher. In 13 career games, he had six hits, all for the Highlanders, and a .250 batting average.

He batted left and threw right-handed. He also pitched in one game for Washington, in 1909, pitching one inning, and collecting a strikeout.

Collins was born in Lafayette, Indiana, and died in Fort Lauderdale, Florida at age 69 .

External links
Baseball Reference.com page

1880 births
1949 deaths
New York Highlanders players
Washington Senators (1901–1960) players
Major League Baseball outfielders
Baseball players from Indiana
Rochester Bronchos players
Gulfport Crabs players
Jackson Senators players
Columbus Discoverers players
Santa Cruz Sand Crabs players
Terre Haute Hottentots players
Memphis Egyptians players
Minneapolis Millers (baseball) players
Buffalo Bisons (minor league) players
Greenwood Chauffeurs players
Greenwood Scouts players
Meridian Metropolitans players
Clarksville Villagers players